Gelatinase A, also known as MMP2 (72-kDa gelatinase, matrix metalloproteinase 2, type IV collagenase, 3/4 collagenase, matrix metalloproteinase 5, 72 kDa gelatinase type A, collagenase IV, collagenase type IV, MMP 2, type IV collagen metalloproteinase, type IV collagenase/gelatinase) is an enzyme. This enzyme catalyses the following chemical reaction

 Cleavage of gelatin type I and collagen types IV, V, VII, X. Cleaves the collagen-like sequence Pro-Gln-Gly-Ile-Ala-Gly-Gln

This secreted endopeptidase belongs to the peptidase family M10.

References

External links 
 

EC 3.4.24